Fatuha also spelled Fatwah or Fatwa, is a Satellite town in proposed Patna Metropolitan Region, in the Patna district in the Indian state of Bihar. Fatuha lies 24 km east of Patna the capital of Bihar. Fatuha is an important industrial centre known for small industries and its handloom industries. The city's name is said to come from its status as a center of textile manufacturing.

Education                                                 
Fatuha also serves as an educational centre . Fatuha high school is a very important educational centre for students who can't go to capital city patna for secondary and higher secondary studies. The high school, fatuha is known for its academics because it has enrolled more than 5000 students who appear in matric and inter examination. The high school, Fatuha was established in 1932.

History & Culture

Fatuha is situated at the confluence of the Ganges and Punpun Rivers. The area is known as Triveni since the river Gandak is believed to unite with these two rivers here earlier. Fatuha is regarded as a very sacred 'sangam' place in  Hindu mythology and is a major pilgrimage and historical centre for Hinduism, Buddhism, Jainism, Islam and Sikhism. Many major religious, mythological and historical figures are said to have visited or passed through Fatuha, and it is part of the Ramayana, Buddhist and Jains circuits. In ancient times, Lord Sri Rama and all his brothers, guru Vishwamitra, Lord Srikrishna, Bheema, emperor Jarasandha, Ajatshatru, Udayin, Lord Mahatma Buddha, and Mahavira Jain were said to have visited Fatuha.

According to Hindu tradition, Lord Vamana laid his step at this 'sangam' while measuring the entire universe as a gift from the demon king Bali; an annual fair called 'Varuni Mela' is celebrated on every Vaman Dwadashi day (day of incarnation of Lord Vamana) as per Vikram calendar to commemorate that event, which coincides with the great festival 'Onam' of Kerala where king Bali is invoked. In Fatuha, Lord Vamana is invoked on this day with great number of rural people assembling at 'Triveni' to swim in the holy waters.

Fatuha is said to have hosted Lord Sri Ram with all his brothers as bride-grooms with their groom party while heading for Janakpuri for their marriages to be organised with the daughters of king Janaka and his brother. They crossed the Ganges River at Fatuha to reach the district of Vaishali on the way to the kingdom of Mithila, the abode of Mother Sita. Fatuha is very important to the Ramayana circuit. 
 
Lord Sri Krishna and Bheema are also said to have passed through Fatuha to kill the first great Magadhan king Jarasandha. Jarasandha was a devout Shaivite and used to visit a very ancient temple dedicated to Lord Shiva at Baikunthpur on the banks of the Ganges River near Fatuha. There is a great annual festival at this place on each Mahashivratri and the temple remains vibrant with a large influx of devotees during Shravan Masa as per Vikram calendar. This temple is a great milestone in the history of Shaivism.

A famous temple called Siddhnath is located at the historical Barabar hills in the Jahanabad district of Bihar. This temple, it is said, was established during the Mauryan period as both Chandragupta Maurya and Ashoka, the great, initially were great champions of Shaivism. The Ganges river water carried from Triveni is the only water which is offered to Lord Shiva at Siddhanath temple.

Fatuha was a great centre for the great medieval sant poet Kabir. There is a very large and rich Kabir monastery at Fatuha, which runs many welfare programmes for the local people. Prominent among them is the donation of a very big tract of prime land at the heart of the city to establish a college, which is now known as the Sant Kabir Mahant Vidyanand Mahavidyalaya.

In the medieval period, Bakhtiyar Khilji, an aide of Muhammad Ghori, passed through Fatuha to sack and burn the great universities of Nalanda, Odantapuri and Vikramshila in 1193. The places of Bakhtiarpur and Khusropur near Fatuha still bear the names of Bakhtiyar Khilji and his commander-in-chief Khusro. Burning of these great universities by Bakhtiyar Khilji led to a dark age in India and Bihar in particular as all the great libraries of those universities containing the entire great knowledge of India were burned. Since then, Bihar has been struggling very hard to come out of acute illiteracy.

Fatuha also became a centre of Sufi saints in medieval times and was visited by many Muslim rulers and conquerors. There is a very famous Sufi shrine at Kachchi Dargah in Fatuha. Numerous people visit the place daily. Days of Thursday & Friday are considered very auspicious. It is like an Ajmer Sarif for the local people where people from all walks of life throng to pay homage to the Sufi saint.

Fatuha was a thriving centre of textile production during the medieval period; a caste called Patwa, experts in textile industry, was concentrated there. It is said that the entire Patwa community has some kind of a root from Fatuha and that the city itself was named Fatwa after the Patwa community. Textile workers still form a very large proportion of city's population and many of them still practice in their traditional textile industry despite severe hardships arisen in modern era.

Geography

Fatuha is situated at the confluence of the Ganges and Punpun Rivers. The Dhoba and Mahatmain Rivers (principal branch of river Falgu before disappearing in "Taal" area) border the city on its southern sides. From nearby Fatuha starts the famous 'Taal' area which is known for rabi crops. The soil of Fatuha is fertile as it is drained by multiple rivers including the Ganges and Punpun. All types of crops are grown in abundance. Fatuha is a big producer of vegetables, particularly of onions. It is located in the lower reach of the middle Ganges basin and has a typical humid Monsoon climate.

The national aquatic animal of India, the dolphin, is a very special feature of Fatuha which was seen aplenty here a decade earlier. The dolphin's range formerly spread from Buxar to Bhagalpur in Bihar, but recent illegal fishing has created a great danger to the species.

Economy
Fatuha is a major rural market, catering to the needs of numerous villages which produce all kinds of agrarian and other rural produces like handicrafts, etc.

Fatuha is an important industrial centre of Bihar and produces farm tractors, scooter, and other products in its industrial district. The industrial sector is being revived, and Fatuha now houses an LPG bottling plant of Bharat Petroleum.

Transport

Fatuha is a major road and rail junction. Proximity to the state capital of Patna, makes Fatuha an important hub for goods being supplied in and out of Patna.

Road

Fatuha is well connected by roads to different cities. NH-30 A connects Patna via Fatuha to Nalanda district and beyond. Fatuha thus serves as the gateway of the capital city of Patna to central and southern Bihar. Similarly, NH 30 connects Patna via Fatuha to northeastern India, making Fatuha an eastern gateway of Patna. Fatuha connects to the trans-Ganges district of Vaishali through the Kachchi Dargah-Rustampur link.

Rail

Fatuha Junction is the railway station for the city of Fatuha. It connects Fatuha with the major cities in India by the Howrah-Delhi Main Line. The Fatuha-Islampur (Nalanda) rail line was also resurrected in 2002 by then-rail minister Sri Nitish Kumar. The line is being further expanded to Natesar to connect with Gaya. Fatuha now has been connected to Rajgir via Daniyawan-Biharsharif. Prime minister Narendra Modi Inaugurated Fatuha-Daniyawan-Biharsharif-Rajgir railway line.

Delicacies
Fatuha is known for its unique dishes, including Tikri, a sweet dish, and Pantua and Mirjai, a sweet prepared from maida, sugar and vegetable oil.

Demographics
 India census, Fatuha had a population of 50,961 with males constituting 52.9% of the population and females 47.1%. Fatuha has an average literacy rate of 70.2%, which is more than the national average of 59.5%. Male literacy is 78%, whereas female literacy is only 59%. 17% of the population is under 6 years of age.

Recent developments
Fatuha was the largest development block of Bihar until trifurcated into Fatuha, Daniyawan & Khushropur. It was also the first development block with its own website (known as the first e-block of Bihar). Fatuha railway yard in its present renovated shape forms the first inland rail container of Bihar, operated & maintained as such by Concor (a Railway undertaking). Since August 2007, Fatuha has functioned as a police subdivision, including police stations of Didarganj, Fatuha, Khusrupur, Daniyawan and Shahjahanpur. Fatuha lies to the north of the newly laid four lane NH-30 connecting Patna and Bakhtiyarpur. Under the master plan of Patna, Fatuha has been declared as a satellite city. Recently the chief minister of Bihar inaugurated the Sonalika tractor plant under which many agricultural tools and machines will be manufactured. In April 2012, the CM laid the foundation stone of world's second largest leather hub to be built at Fatuha. A bridge across river Ganga to connect Fatuha with north Bihar is also proposed to be built between village Kachchi Dargah (Fatuha)& Rustampur (Vaishali district). In January 2011, the first Ganges River police station was inaugurated by the Chief Minister near Maujipur village of Fatuha. 
Fatuha was once selected for the establishment of a possible IIM type B-school.

Villages
 
 
Gauri Pundah

References

Cities and towns in Patna district
Neighbourhoods in Patna
Populated places on the Punpun River